Spialia rosae is a butterfly of the family Hesperiidae. It is found only in Spain.

The larvae feed on roses.

References

Spialia
Butterflies described in 2016
Endemic fauna of Spain